Caleb's Posse (foaled April 4, 2008) is a retired American Thoroughbred racehorse and a Breeders Cup champion.

2-year-old season 
Trained by Donnie K. Von Hemel, Caleb's Posse ran a total of 6 times as a 2 year old. His 3 wins were in the a maiden special weight, allowance, and the non graded Clever Trevor Stakes. His only graded stakes effort was in the Gr. 3  Arlington-Washington Futurity where he finished 3rd.

3-year-old season 
After 3 tries for a win Caleb's Posse took the Ohio Derby and also won the Amsterdam Stakes. This was followed up with a close nose victory in  the Grade 1 Kings Bishop. He then won his signature race in the Breeders' Cup Dirt Mile over Shackleford and future dirt mile winner Tapizar.

4-year -old season 
As a 4 year old,  Caleb's Posse ran 3 times, finishing second every time. In his last race, he lost to Shackleford by a nose.

Career and earnings 
Overall Caleb's Posse record was 19-8-5-2 with a total money earnings of 1,423,379.

References

2008 racehorse births
Racehorses bred in Kentucky
Racehorses trained in the United States
Thoroughbred family 9-f
Breeders' Cup Dirt Mile winners